Julia mishimaensis is a species of a sea snail with a shell comprising two separate hinged pieces or valves. It is a marine gastropod mollusk in the family Juliidae.

Distribution
The type locality for this species is Yamaguchi Prefecture, Japan.

This species is found in the eastern Pacific from Mexico to Peru.

References

Juliidae
Gastropods described in 1982